Pablo Doffo (born 6 April 1983 in Argentina) is an Argentinean retired footballer.

References

Argentine footballers
Association football midfielders
Living people
1983 births
Sportivo Belgrano footballers
Floriana F.C. players
Naxxar Lions F.C. players
Senglea Athletic F.C. players
Marsaxlokk F.C. players